Lake Schwerin is a lake in Mecklenburg-Vorpommern, northern Germany. It was named after the city Schwerin, on its southwestern shore. The smaller town Bad Kleinen is on the north shore of the lake. The natural outflow of the lake is the (channelized) river Stör, a tributary of the Elde, and part of the Elbe watershed. The Wallensteingraben, a 16th-century canal, connects the lake with the Baltic Sea at Wismar.

Gallery

References

External links

 

Schwerin
Schwerin
Federal waterways in Germany